Local elections were held in Antipolo on May 9, 2016, within the Philippine general election. The voters will elect candidates for the elective local posts in the city: the mayor, vice mayor, the two district congressmen, two provincial board members of Rizal, one for each district, and the sixteen councilors, eight in each of the city's districts.

Background
Incumbent Dr. Casimiro "Jun" Ynares III of the Nationalist People's Coalition is running for reelection. His running mate is incumbent second district councilor Josefina "Pining" Gatlabayan, the wife of former mayor and second district representative Angelito Gatlabayan.

Ynares' opponent is his estranged vice mayor, Ronaldo "Puto" Leyva. Leyva was stripped of all administrative powers and privileges vested in his position since 2013 by Ynares and his allies in the city council, and has cried political harassment since.  Leyva also holds the distinction of being the elected official who is not allowed to hold office inside a city hall. His running mate is his 2013 partner, former councilor, vice mayor, and mayor Danilo "Nilo" Leyble, and his team will field a complete slate down to councilors.

Candidates
Incumbents are expressed in italics. Winners expressed in bold.

Mayor
Dr. Casimiro "Jun" Ynares III is running for reelection; among his opponents is incumbent Vice Mayor Ronaldo "Puto" Leyva.

Vice Mayor

Former Mayor Danilo Leyble is running for Vice Mayor, his opponent is the wife of former Mayor Angelito Gatlabayan, incumbent Councilor Josefina "Pining" Gatlabayan. Incumbent vice mayor Ronaldo Leyva is running for mayoralty.

District Representatives

1st District
Roberto Puno is term-limited as he has reached the maximum three-term limit for any elective official.  His wife, media personality, Chiqui Roa-Puno, will run in his stead and will be challenged by incumbent first district councilor Juanito "Dudok" Lawis.

2nd District
Romeo Acop is running for reelection for his third and final term unopposed.  Acop, who prior to the filing of certificates of candidacy for this elections was a known mayoralty bet for the city, is a common candidate of both Team AntiPoLo 2016 (Team Puto-Nilo) and Team Ynares.

Provincial Board Members

1st District

2nd District

Councilors

Team AntipoLo 2016 (Puto-Nilo Team)

Team Ynares

1st District

|-bgcolor=black
|colspan=5|

2nd District

|-bgcolor=black
|colspan=5|

References

2016 Philippine local elections
Politics of Antipolo
Elections in Antipolo
2016 elections in Calabarzon